Andre Brandon deWilde (April 9, 1942 – July 6, 1972) was an American theater, film, and television actor. Born into a theatrical family in Brooklyn, he debuted on Broadway at the age of seven and became a national phenomenon by the time he completed his 492 performances for The Member of the Wedding. He won a Donaldson Award for his performance, becoming the youngest actor to win one, and starred in the subsequent film adaptation for which he won a Golden Globe Award.

DeWilde is best known for his performance as Joey Starrett in the film Shane (1953) for which he was nominated for the Academy Award for Best Supporting Actor. He also starred in his own sitcom Jamie on ABC and became a household name making numerous radio and TV appearances before being featured on the cover of Life magazine on March 10, 1952, for his second Broadway outing, Mrs. McThing.

He continued acting in stage, film and television roles into adulthood before his death at age 30 in a car crash in Colorado on July 6, 1972.

Early life
Andre Brandon deWilde was the son of Frederic A. "Fritz" deWilde and Eugenia (née Wilson) deWilde. Fritz deWilde was the only son of Dutch immigrants, who changed their surname from Neitzel-de Wilde to "deWilde" when they emigrated to the United States. He was a descendant of the Dutch merchant and seigneur Andries de Wilde, who was married to Cornelia Henrica Neitzel.
Fritz deWilde became an actor and Broadway production stage manager. Eugenia was a part-time stage actress.

After deWilde's birth, the family moved from Brooklyn to Baldwin, Long Island.

Career

Acting
DeWilde made his much-acclaimed Broadway debut at the age of seven in The Member of the Wedding. He was the first child actor to win the Donaldson Award, and his talent was praised by John Gielgud the following year. He also starred in the 1952 film version of the play, which was directed by Fred Zinnemann.

In 1952 deWilde acted in the film Shane as Joey Starrett and was nominated for an Academy Award for Best Supporting Actor for his performance, becoming the youngest nominee at the time in a competitive category. He starred in his own television series, Jamie, which aired in 1953 and 1954. Although the series was popular, it was canceled because of a contract dispute. In 1956, he was featured with Walter Brennan, Phil Harris and Sidney Poitier in the coming-of-age Batjac film production of Good-bye, My Lady, adapted from James Street's book.

DeWilde's soft-spoken manner of speech in his early roles was more akin to a Southern drawl. In 1956, at the age of 14, deWilde narrated the classical music works Peter and the Wolf by Sergei Prokofiev and The Young Person's Guide to the Orchestra by Benjamin Britten. He also recorded a reading of Huckleberry Finn on the album The Stories of Mark Twain along with his Good-bye, My Lady costar Brennan.

DeWilde shared an onscreen camaraderie with both James Stewart and Audie Murphy in the 1957 Western Night Passage. In 1958, deWilde starred in The Missouri Traveler, sharing lead billing with Lee Marvin in another coming-of-age film, this one set in the early 1900s. At the age of 17, he played an adolescent father in the 1959 drama Blue Denim. He guest-starred on many TV series, including Alcoa Theatre and the popular Western series Wagon Train.<ref name=IMDB>[https://www.imdb.com/name/nm0001121/ Brandon deWilde Acting Credits] at IMDb</ref>

In 1961, deWilde appeared in the Alfred Hitchcock Presents episode "The Sorcerer's Apprentice" as Hugo, a mentally impaired youth who cannot separate fact from fantasy. After seeing a magician saw a woman in half at a carnival, Hugo emulates the trick and kills a woman by sawing her in half. The episode never aired on NBC because the finale was deemed too gruesome by 1960s television standards.

The following year, deWilde appeared in All Fall Down, opposite Warren Beatty and Eva Marie Saint, and in Martin Ritt's Hud (1963), co-starring with Paul Newman, Patricia Neal and Melvyn Douglas. Although the only lead actor not to be Oscar-nominated for Hud, deWilde accepted the Best Supporting Actor trophy on behalf of costar Melvyn Douglas (who was in Spain at the time). That same year, he appeared in Jack Palance's ABC circus drama The Greatest Show on Earth.

DeWilde signed a two-picture deal with Disney in 1964. He first starred in The Tenderfoot, a three-part comedy Western for Walt Disney's Wonderful World of Color TV show with Brian Keith. The following year, he and Keith starred in Those Calloways, reuniting deWilde with his Good-bye, My Lady star Walter Brennan. Also in 1965, deWilde played PT boat officer Jere Torry, serving under his admiral father played by John Wayne, in the Pacific theater World War II drama In Harm's Way (1965).

After 1965, many of his roles were limited to television guest appearances. "Being small for his age and a bit too pretty ... in his favour as a child ... worked against him as an adult," wrote author Linda Ashcroft after talking with deWilde at a party, "He spoke of giving up movies until he could come back as a forty-year-old character actor." DeWilde's final western role was in Dino De Laurentiis' 1971 Spaghetti Western The Deserter, one year before his death. He made his last screen appearance in Wild in the Sky (1972).

Music
DeWilde had hoped to embark on a music career. He asked his friend Gram Parsons (later of the Byrds and founder of the seminal country rock band the Flying Burrito Brothers) and his International Submarine Band to back him in a recording session. ISB guitarist John Nuese claimed that deWilde sang harmony with Parsons better than anyone except Emmylou Harris. Bassist Ian Dunlop wrote, "The lure of getting a record out was tugging hard at Brandon."

Parsons and Harris later co-wrote a song titled "In My Hour of Darkness", the first verse of which refers to the car crash that killed deWilde.

Personal life
DeWilde was married twice and had one son. His first marriage was to writer Susan M. Maw, whom he wed in 1963. The couple had a son, Jesse, before divorcing in 1969. He married Janice Gero in April 1972, three months before his death.

Death
On July 6, 1972, while in Colorado for a Denver stage production of Butterflies Are Free, deWilde was killed in a traffic accident in the Denver suburb of Lakewood. He was driving alone, not wearing a seatbelt, in a camper van that left the roadway before striking a guardrail and a parked truck. The van rolled onto its side, and he was pinned in the wreckage. He was taken to St. Anthony Hospital, where he died at 7:20 p.m. of multiple injuries that included a broken back, neck and leg. He was 30 years old.

DeWilde was originally buried in Hollywood, but his parents later moved his remains to Pinelawn Memorial Park in Farmingdale, New York to be closer to their home on Long Island.

Filmography

Awards

 See also 

 List of child prodigies
 List of youngest Academy Award nominees (Best Supporting Actor)

References

Further reading
 Best, Marc. Those Endearing Young Charms: Child Performers of the Screen (South Brunswick and New York: Barnes & Co., 1971), pp. 62–67.
 Dye, David. Child and Youth Actors: Filmography of Their Entire Careers, 1914-1985. Jefferson, NC: McFarland & Co., 1988, pp. 56–57.
 Holmstrom, John. The Moving Picture Boy: An International Encyclopaedia from 1895 to 1995, Norwich, Michael Russell, 1996, pp. 232–233.
 McLean, Patrisha, All Fall Down, The Brandon deWilde Story''

External links

 
 
 
 
 Brooklyn Daily Eagle / Gifted Young Brooklynite
 Brandon deWilde at Classic Movie Kids
 
 

1942 births
1972 deaths
20th-century American male actors
American male child actors
American male film actors
American male stage actors
American male television actors
Burials in New York (state)
Donaldson Award winners
Male actors from New York City
People from Brooklyn
American people of Dutch descent
Road incident deaths in Colorado
People from Baldwin, Nassau County, New York